The Parañaque Lady Aces are a professional women's team which plays in the Philippine Women's National Basketball League (WNBL). It is the women's counterpart of the Parañaque Aces which plays in the National Basketball League (NBL). It is supported by the city government of Parañaque and is owned by city councilor Marvin Santos.

History
The Lady Aces first played in the WNBL during its 2019 season. Lacking in tall players, the team failed to progress to the playoffs in that season. When the WNBL turned professional for its 2021 season, the Lady Aces are among the participating teams and was able to acquire new players through the league's first ever draft.

National team players
Allana Lim
Clare Castro

References

Women's basketball teams in the Philippines
Women's National Basketball League (Philippines) teams